Nicola Davies (born 3 May 1958) is an English zoologist and writer.  She was one of the original presenters of the BBC children's wildlife programme The Really Wild Show. More recently, she has made her name as a children's author. Her books include Home, which was shortlisted for the Branford Boase Award, and Poo (2004), which was illustrated by Neal Layton, and was shortlisted for a Blue Peter Book Award in 2006; in the United States, the book is published as Poop: A Natural History of the Unmentionable. Her children's picture book The Promise won the Green Book Award in 2015. She has also written several novels for adults under the pseudonym Stevie Morgan.

Gaia Warriors — published in November 2009 by Walker Books, and written in association with, and with an afterword by James Lovelock — is a book about climate change that explains the science and answers the commonly asked questions about global warming.

Davies is married to Daniel Jones, she has two children from her first marriage.

Works
Big Blue Whale (1997) Illustrated by Nick Maland
Bat Loves the Night (2001) Illustrated by Sarah Fox Davies
One Tiny Turtle (2001) Illustrated by Jane Chapman
Wild About Dolphins (2001) published by Walker Books 
Surprising Sharks (2003) illustrated by James Croft
Birds (2003) published by Kingfisher in the Kingfisher Young Knowledge series
Poo: A Natural History of the Unmentionable (2004) illustrated by Neal Layton
Oceans and Seas (2004) published by Kingfisher in the Kingfisher Young Knowledge series 
Home (2005) published by Walker Books
Ice Bear (2005) Illustrated by Gary Blythe
Extreme Animals: The Toughest Creatures (2006) Illustrated by Neil Layton
What's eating you? Parasites: the Inside Story (2007) Illustrated by Neil Layton
White Owl, Barn Owl (2007) Illustrated by Michael Foreman
Up on the Hill (2008) with design by Terry Milne, published by Walker Books
Gaia Warriors (2009) - a book about climate change and what to do about it, published by Walker Books
Just the Right Size: Why Big Animals are Big and Little Animals are Little (2009) Illustrated by Neil Layton, awarded 2021 Mathical Honors
Grow your Own Monsters (2010) by Nicola Davies and Simon Hickmott
Everything You Need to Know About Animals (2010) published by Kingfisher
A Girl Called Dog (2011), published by Corgi
Monsters of the Deep (2011) 
Talk, Talk, Squawk (2011) Illustrated by Neil Layton
Welcome to Silver Street Farm (2011) with illustrations by Katharine McEwen, published by Walker Books
Escape from Silver Street Farm (2011) Illustrated by Katharine McEwen, published by Walker Books
Spring Fever at Silver Street Farm (2011) Illustrated by Katharine McEwen, published by Walker Books
All Aboard at Silver Street Farm (2011) Illustrated by Katharine McEwen, published by Walker Books
A First Book of Nature (2012) Illustrated by Mark Hearld. Published as Outside Your Window in the US (2012). Winner of the Independent Booksellers Best Picture Book.
Deadly (2012) Illustrated by Neal Layton, published by Walker Books
Dolphin Baby (2012) Illustrated by Brita Granstrom
Frozen Solid at Silver Street Farm (2012) Illustrated by Katharine McEwen, published by Walker Books
Just Ducks! (2012) Illustrated by Salvatore Rubbino Shortlisted for the Kate Greenaway Medal 2013
Rubbish Town Hero (2012) published by Corgi
What will I be? (2012) Illustrated by Marc Boutavant
Who's like Me? (2012) Illustrated by Marc Boutavant
Deserts (2012) (Discover Science series)
What Happens Next? (2012) Illustrated by Marc Boutavant
Crowded Out at Silver Street Farm (2012) Illustrated by Katharine McEwen
Manatee Baby (2013) (Heroes of the Wild series)
The Elephant Road (2013) with illustration by Annabel Wright, published by Walker Books (Heroes of the Wild series)
The Lion Who Stole My Arm (2013) Winner of The Portsmouth Book Award 2014 (Heroes of the Wild series)
The Promise (2013) Illustrated by Laura Carlin. Winner of the 2014 English Association Picture Book award for best fiction.
Walking the Bear (2013) (Heroes of the Wild series)
Whale Boy (2013) Shortlisted for the "Best Story" category of the 2014 Blue Peter Book Awards
Tiny Creatures: the World of Microbes (2014) Illustrated by Emily Sutton
The Leopard's Tail (2015) Illustrated by Annabel Wright (Heroes of the Wild series)
The Whale Who Saved Us (2015) Illustrated by Annabel Wright (Heroes of the Wild series)
I Don't Like Snakes (2015) Illustrated by Luciano Lozano
A First Book of Animals (2016) Illustrated by Petr Horácek
Survivors: The Toughest Creatures on Earth (2016) Illustrated by Neal Layton, published by Walker Books
Animal Surprises (2016) Illustrated by Abbie Cameron, published by Graffeg
Into The Blue (2016) Illustrated by Abbie Cameron, published by Graffeg
The Word Bird (2016) Illustrated by Abbie Cameron, published by Graffeg
The White Hare (2016) with illustrations by Anastasia Izlesou, published by Graffeg - part of the Shadows and Light series
Mother Cary's Butter Knife (2016) with illustrations by Anja Uhren, published by Graffeg - part of the Shadows and Light series
Perfect (2016) Illustrated by Cathy Fisher, published by Graffeg
Lots: The Diversity of Life on Earth (2017) Illustrated by Emily Sutton
Animals Behaving Badly (2017) Illustrated by Adam Stower, published by Walker Books
Dolphin Baby (2017) Illustrated by Brita Granstrom, published by Walker Books
The Variety of Life (2017) Illustrated by Lorna Scobie
King of the Sky (2017) Illustrated by Laura Carlin, published by Walker, shortlisted for the Tir na n-Og Award
The Pond (2017) Illustrated by Cathy Fisher, published by Graffeg
Elias Martin (2017) Illustrated by Fran Shum, published by Graffeg
A First Book of the Sea (July 2018) Illustrated by Emily Sutton, published by Walker Books
The Day the War Came (2018) Illustrated by Rebecca Cobb *Shortlisted for The Kate Greenaway Medal
The Little Mistake (2018) with illustrations by Cathy Fisher, published by Graffeg - part of the Country Tales series
Flying Free (2018) with illustrations by Cathy Fisher, published by Graffeg - part of the Country Tales series
Ariki and the Giant Shark (2018) with illustrations by Nicola Kinnear, published by Walker
The Secret of the Egg (2018) with illustrations by Abbie Cameron, published by Graffeg
The Eel Question (2018) with illustrations by Beth Holland, published by Graffeg - part of the Shadows and Light series
Bee Boy and the Moonflowers (2018) with illustrations by Max Low, published by Graffeg - part of the Shadows and Light series
Brave and the Fox (2018) Illustrated by Sebastien Braun, published by Scholastic
The Dog That Saved Christmas (2018) with illustrations by Mike Byrne, published by Barrington Stoke
The Mountain Lamb (2019) with illustrations by Cathy Fisher, published by Graffeg - part of the Country Tales series
A Boy's Best Friend (2019) with illustrations by Cathy Fisher, published by Graffeg - part of the Country Tales series
Ariki and the Island of Wonders (2019) with illustrations by Nicola Kinnear, published by Walker
Hummingbird (2019) Illustrated by Jane Ray
Every Child A Song (2019) Illustrated by Marc Martin, published by Wren & Rook
The Wonder of Trees (2019) Illustrated by Lorna Scobie, published by Hodder
Butterflies for Grandpa Joe (2019) Illustrated by Mike Byrne, published by Barrington Stoke *Shortlisted for the Wales Book of the Year 2020
My Butterfly Bouquet (2020) Illustrated by Hannah Peck, published by Wren & Rook
Grow: Secrets of Our DNA (2020) Illustrated by Emily Sutton, published by Walker Books
Ride The Wind (2020) Illustrated by Salvatore Rubbino, published by Walker Books
Pretend Cows (2020) with illustrations by Cathy Fisher, published by Graffeg - part of the Country Tales series
Last (2020) written and illustrated by Nicola Davies (her debut as illustrator) published by Tiny Owl
The New Girl (2020) Illustrated by Cathy Fisher, published by Graffeg
This is How the Change Begins (2021) published by Graffeg
The Song That Sings Us (2021) Cover illustration by Jackie Morris, published by Firefly Press
One World: 24 Hours on Planet Earth (2021) Illustrated by Jenni Desmond, published by Walker Books *Shortlisted for the Wainwright Prize 2022
Protecting the Planet: The Season of Giraffes (2022) Illustrated by Emily Sutton, published by Walker Books
Invertebrates are Cool! (2022) Illustrated by Abbie Cameron, published by Graffeg
The Magic of Flight (2022) Illustrated by Lorna Scobie, published by Hodder
Choose Love (2022) Illustrated by Petr Horácek, published by Graffeg

References

External links

 
 Nicola Davies at Walker Books
 Nicola Davies at David Higham Associates
 
 Stevie Morgan at LC Authorities (no catalogue records) and Morgan at WorldCat

1958 births
Living people
English zoologists
English women novelists
English children's writers